Dendrobium ruckeri is a specie of flowering plant in the family Orchidaceae. It is native to the eastern Himalayas (Bhutan, Assam, Arunachal Pradesh and Myanmar).

References

ruckeri
Orchids of Asia
Flora of East Himalaya
Orchids of Assam
Orchids of Myanmar
Flora of Arunachal Pradesh
Flora of Bhutan
Plants described in 1843